The Official Fuzzy Warbles Collector's Album is a CD box set of rarities from XTC guitarist and frontman Andy Partridge. The box set brings together the eight previously released Fuzzy Warbles volumes, originally issued between 2002 and 2006 and featuring designs inspired by postage stamps. The Collector's Album packaging makes a nod to the philatelic theme which it affirms by featuring an exclusive ninth disc called Hinges. The large volume of material dates back to 1979.

Tracks include mastered versions of long-circulated bootlegs and many demos of previously unreleased songs. Many of the demos are from the 1980s as well as the period in the 1990s when XTC was under obligation to Virgin Records, but not releasing albums. One highlight is a series of songs penned for Disney's James and the Giant Peach though not used for the film.

Fuzzy Warbles albums
UK CD APEBOX001
Fuzzy Warbles Volume 1 (2002)
Fuzzy Warbles Volume 2 (2002)
Fuzzy Warbles Volume 3 (2003)
Fuzzy Warbles Volume 4 (2003)
Fuzzy Warbles Volume 5 (2004)
Fuzzy Warbles Volume 6 (2004)
Fuzzy Warbles Volume 7 (2006)
Fuzzy Warbles Volume 8 (2006)
Hinges (2006)

References

Andy Partridge albums
2006 compilation albums
Demo albums